Tübatulabal  is an extinct Uto-Aztecan language, traditionally spoken in Kern County, California, United States. It is the traditional language of the Tübatulabal, who have now shifted to English. The language originally had three main dialects: Bakalanchi, Pakanapul and Palegawan.

In English, the name Tübatulabal refers to both the Tübatulabal people and their language. However, in the language itself, the term Tübatulabal refers only to the Tübatulabal people. Its origin is unclear, but it may be related to the noun stem  "pine nuts".

Phonology

Segmental phonology

Vowels
There are six phonemic vowels in Tübatulabal:

Contrastive short and long versions of each vowel are found in both stressed and unstressed syllables. The vowels have various allophones which occur in different environments, most notably more central lax allophones when the vowels are short and occur in unstressed syllables. i and u can occur as the second member of a diphthong with any other vowel, resulting in ten possible diphthongs (Voegelin reports that ɨu is rare). Phonologically, the members of a diphthong are treated as distinct segments. For example, the common initial reduplication process, which copies the first stem vowel, copies only the first member of a diphthong, e.g.:

 'the sucker fish'
 'the many suckers in one place'

Vowel length is contrastive. In most cases, the first suffix is short, the second suffix is long, the third suffix is short, and so on. For example, the verbal stem  'to eat' can be expanded to  'let us go and pretend to eat'. In this word, each suffix alternates in length compared to its neighbors. When arranged differently, the same suffixes will have different lengths. Thus compare  'let us' with the realization of the same morpheme in  'let us go eat'.

Tübatulabal consonants show a basic voicing distinction, with a corresponding alternately voiced phoneme present for almost every obstruent. Tübatulabal voiceless consonants are unaspirated, like those in English after an initial /s/, e.g. as in 'spin', 'stiff', 'skin'.

Non-contrastive allophones of all vowels occur, usually when a vowel follows a nasal consonant, and especially when it also precedes a glottal consonant.

Consonants

All consonants except the glottal stop can occur as geminates. Gemination is often phonologically predictable. In particular, all consonants except the voiced stops and the glottal stop geminate when following a short vowel. All stops and affricates are geminated in word-final position, regardless of the length of the preceding vowel.

Prosody
Tübatulabal has predictable word stress, which is tied to morphological constituency and syllable weight. Primary stress falls on the final syllable of the stem. Secondary stress is assigned right to left from the final syllable, falling on every other mora:

 "he is wanting to roll string on his thigh" 
 "the fruit is mashing"

Words with the form VːCVCV will be stressed as ˌVːCVˈCV:

 "the pine-nut pole"

For the purposes of stress assignment, two identical short vowels that are separated only by a glottal stop are treated as a single vowel if and only if they belong to the same morpheme:

 "the little one"

Morphology

There are three basic word types in Tübatulabal: verbs, nouns, and particles. Verbs may be formed from verbal stems or from noun stems with verbalizing morphology; similarly, nouns can be formed from noun stems or from verbal stems with nominalizing morphology. Particles have their own stems, but they have comparatively little inflection, whereas both verbs and nouns tend to be very morphologically complex.

There are four word-formation processes in Tübatulabal: suffixation, reduplication, conjunction and compounding.

Suffixation

Suffixation is the most common and productive process in agglutinative word-formation. Suffixes form a closed class and occur in a fixed order according to the word type.

Reduplication

There are two kinds of reduplication: full reduplication and partial reduplication. Full reduplication is the less common type and marks the iterative aspect in verbs.

Partial reduplication can occur as initial or final reduplication. Final reduplication is very rare and always expresses the idea of plural allegiance. Voegelin illustrates with an example:

 'his hunting partner'
 'his hunting partner (in the sense that the partner referred to, being very proficient, has many companions in hunting)'

Initial reduplication is far more productive. It is used to express collective plurality in nouns
and to express aspect reversal in verbs. Initial reduplication prefixes a copy of the first vowel of the stem (as well as any immediately following nasal), preceded by a fixed . The underlying stem-initial consonant (if any) may also undergo changes, particularly in voicing and length. Some examples illustrate the reduplication process:

Conjunction
Conjunction involves the combination of a particle with a word of another type. According to Voegelin, the behavior of particles is similar to that of enclitics in other Uto-Aztecan languages but distinct enough from them that it should not be considered to be a kind of cliticization.

Compounding

Compounding appears to have been a much more productive process at an earlier stage of the language. It now has very limited productivity, and in many cases, it appears to have been completely lexicalized if it occurs.

Verb morphology

Each verb stem has an unpredictable inherent aspect value (either telic or atelic; by default, a bare stem is inherently atelic), and an inherent value for transitivity (transitive, intransitive or impersonal). The inherent values can be changed by morphological addition to yield a verb stem with any of the other possible values. Aspect reversal is indicated by initial reduplication. Transitivity change is indicated by the use of one (or more) of a number of derivational suffixes with which verbs are constructed.

The full verb structure can be summarized as (A) + B + (C) + (D), where B is the verb root, and the other positions (all optional) represent classes of morphemes. A indicates initial reduplication, which can occur only once per word. C indicates a class of derivational morphemes, which can be divided into ten ordered positions, each of which allows at most one morpheme per word. D is the final position; there are nine possible morphemes in final position, but only one can occur in any single word.

The C class morphemes are given with examples in the table below. When these morphemes co-occur in a word, they must occur in the order given. Transitivity changing morphemes are marked with *. They have a different effect depending on the inherent transitivity of the verb root, as well as the presence of other transitivity-changing morphology.

The possible verbal final morphemes (class D) are shown below. Unlike the class C morphemes, only one of these final-position morphemes can occur in any single word. Therefore, the ordering of morphemes in this table does not indicate anything about a linear relationship among the morphemes.

Noun morphology

All nouns (whether derived from verb stems or noun stems) are obligatorily marked as absolute or relative. Nouns must also be marked with one of the three basic cases: subject, object, or genitive. Relative nouns make a finer distinction between suus and ejus objects and genitives. In addition to this obligatory morphology, nouns may also receive suffixes indicating several secondary cases (inessive, ablative, allative and instrumental) as well as many other derivational suffixes.

Nouns may be divided into three basic classes according to their stem shape and morphological behavior and sometimes according to their semantic contribution as well. The basic test for classification is how the noun occurs when it is absolute. The absolute suffix has a different allomorph when it occurs with a noun from each of these classes. Class A nouns all have vowel-final stems, and add the absolute suffix as -l. Class B noun stems may be vowel-final or consonant-final, but in either case the absolute suffix is -t. Class C is a small class of nouns, many of which are kinship terms or other inalienable nouns. The absolute noun is phonologically null when it occurs with class C nouns.

Each of the classes can be subdivided into two or more classes, depending on phonological differences in the noun stem that lead to divergent behavior in certain case forms. Specifically, class A is divided into A1 nouns (stems end with a long vowel) and A2 nouns (stems end with a short vowel). Class B is divided into five subclasses, depending on whether the stem ends in a short vowel, a long vowel, n, m, or a voiceless consonant. Class C is divided into C1 (nouns which take an overt relative suffix) and C2 (nouns with no overt relative suffix).

Particle morphology
Morphemes belonging to the particle class are distinguished by the fact that they undergo little or no inflection and suffixation, unlike verbs and nouns. The particle class includes two subclasses of morphemes which behave quite differently: conjunctive particles and independent particles.

Conjunctive particles resemble clitics in that they never appear independently but always lean on another word. However, unlike clitics, conjunctive particles typically bear their own stress, and they do not alter the stress of the word on which they lean. Conjunctive particles include various discourse and modal morphemes as well as the typical pronominal agreement morphemes that occur with verbs.

Independent particles are fully independent words. They include prepositional, modal and exclamatory morphemes, numerals, and one class of pronouns.

The table below shows the pronominal morphemes of Tübatulabal. Like nouns, pronouns distinguish between three cases: subject, object and possessive. (Pronouns do not make a distinction between absolute and relative entities.) Different forms exist for first-, second- and third-person entities. Second- and third-person forms distinguish only singular and plural numbers, but first-person forms distinguish between singular, dual inclusive, dual exclusive, and plural numbers. All pronouns may be expressed bu conjunctive particles. The subject pronouns are unique in that they can also be expressed by an independent particle.

The first-person subject conjunctive forms have special allomorphs when they occur with the exhortative suffix -ma:

The third-person conjunctive form is usually null, but it is expressed by -d͡za after the exhortative or permissive suffixes. (The suffix often undergoes syncope and devoicing, yielding -t͡s.) The second-person conjunctive plural subject form may also syncopate, and medial vowel then shortens as well: -bum. The first-person conjunctive singular subject form may also syncopate, triggering devoicing but no irregular phonology: the suffix then has the form -k.

Subject pronouns typically lean on verbs (if conjunctive) and correspond to grammatical subject: iwikkːɨki "I discarded (it)" (with devoicing); anabaːhaʃta "they can throw it" (with metathesis of the components of the affricate and a change of s > ʃ).

Object pronouns also lean on verbs and indicate any non-possessive oblique function, including transitive objects, ditransitive objects or benefactives, objects of imperative verbs, and subjects of subordinate verbs if not equivalent to the subject of the matrix verb.

Possessive pronouns typically lean on the possessum:  "my house";  "his wife".

Syntax

Word order is generally flexible. (p. 185)

Orthography

Transcriptions in this article follow the International Phonetic Alphabet (IPA). Much published material concerning Tübatulabal uses the Americanist orthography. In addition, the most important linguistic work on Tübatulabal, the original grammatical description of the language,  uses a somewhat different orthography.

The letter  in the name Tübatulabal represents the central unrounded vowel .

Notes

Bibliography
 
 Arvidson, Lucy. Alaawich (Our Language): First Book of Words in the Tübatulabal Language of Southern California

External links 

Tubatulabal language overview at the Survey of California and Other Indian Languages
"Tubatulabal Language" at native-languages.org
Recordings of Tübatulabal recorded by JP Harrington
OLAC resources in and about the Tübatulabal language
Audio recordings of word lists in Tübatulabal from the Northern Uto-Aztecan Collection of Megan Crowhurst at AILLA. 
Tübatulabal, California Language Archives

Agglutinative languages
Northern Uto-Aztecan languages
Languages of the United States
Endangered Uto-Aztecan languages